Zion Lutheran Church, also known as The Lutheran Church of Middle Smithfield, is a historic Lutheran church located in Delaware Water Gap National Recreation Area at Middle Smithfield Township, Monroe County, Pennsylvania.  It was built in 1851, and is a one-story, brick building in a modified Greek Revival style.  It is built of brick made by members of the congregation and has a slate covered front gable roof.

It was added to the National Register of Historic Places in 1972.

References

External links

Churches on the National Register of Historic Places in Pennsylvania
Historic American Buildings Survey in Pennsylvania
Churches completed in 1851
Churches in Monroe County, Pennsylvania
Lutheran churches in Pennsylvania
1851 establishments in Pennsylvania
National Register of Historic Places in Monroe County, Pennsylvania
Delaware Water Gap National Recreation Area